The 1998 ANZ Tasmanian International was a tennis tournament played on outdoor hard courts at the Hobart International Tennis Centre in Hobart in Australia that was part of Tier IV of the 1998 WTA Tour. The tournament was held from 11 through 17 January 1998.

Finals

Singles

 Patty Schnyder defeated  Dominique Van Roost, 6–3, 6–2
 It was Schnyder's 1st title of the year and the 1st of her career.

Doubles

 Virginia Ruano Pascual /  Paola Suárez' defeated  Julie Halard-Decugis /  Janette Husárová, 7–6(8–6), 6–3
 It was Ruano Pascual's 1st title of the year and the 2nd of her career. It was Suárez's 1st title of the year and the 2nd of her career.

References

External links
 WTA Tournament Profile

  
Tasmanian International
Tas
Hobart International